Vasily Savin (born 2 April 1967) is a Soviet former skier. He competed in the Nordic combined events at the 1988 Winter Olympics and the 1992 Winter Olympics.

References

External links
 

1967 births
Living people
Soviet male Nordic combined skiers
Olympic Nordic combined skiers of the Soviet Union
Olympic Nordic combined skiers of the Unified Team
Nordic combined skiers at the 1988 Winter Olympics
Nordic combined skiers at the 1992 Winter Olympics
People from Murmansk
Sportspeople from Murmansk Oblast